Ganga Bikram Sijapati was a Nepalese writer.

In 1958, Sijapati was awarded the Madan Puraskar, Nepal's highest literary honour, for his book Udhyan.

He was born in Kathmandu, Nepal.

References 

Madan Puraskar winners
Nepalese male writers
Nepali-language writers
People from Kathmandu
Year of birth missing
Year of death missing